Clube Ferroviário de Quelimane, is a football club from Quelimane, Mozambique, who play in the regionalized Moçambola 2 (Center Zone).

The club finished bottom of the Moçambola in 2015 and were relegated.

References

Football clubs in Mozambique